Paul Hughes is a paralympic athlete from Great Britain competing mainly in category C5 sprint events.

Paul competed in both the 1992 and 1996 Summer Paralympics. In the 1992 games he failed to qualify for the final of the 200 m but won a silver medal in the 100 m behind American Larry Banks who set a new world record. In the 1996 games he finished third in the 100 m winning the bronze medal.

References

External links
 

Year of birth missing (living people)
Living people
British male sprinters
Paralympic athletes of Great Britain
Paralympic silver medalists for Great Britain
Paralympic bronze medalists for Great Britain
Paralympic medalists in athletics (track and field)
Athletes (track and field) at the 1992 Summer Paralympics
Athletes (track and field) at the 1996 Summer Paralympics
Medalists at the 1992 Summer Paralympics
Medalists at the 1996 Summer Paralympics
20th-century British people